Gareth Edward Moore OP (6 July 1948 – 6 December 2002) was an English theologian, author and Dominican friar.

Early life and education 
Moore was the son of George Edward Moore, a stevedore, and his second wife Alice (nee Langley). He was born in Bermondsey and lived with his parents and his older half-brother, son of Alice in a previous marriage, in Rotherhithe.  He attended Raine's Foundation Grammar School. Gareth was a successful student and taught himself Russian through independent study. He was the first pupil from the school to get a scholarship to Corpus Christi College, Oxford, where he graduated with a B.Litt degree, with his dissertation on the later writings of Ludwig Wittgenstein.

Career 
He briefly joined the monastery at Quarr Abbey on the Isle of Wight but left to visit Zambia and teach mathematics. In 1977, Moore joined the Dominicans as a novice.

In 1995, Moore was elected prior of the Couvent de l’Epiphanie in Rixensart, Belgium. In 2001, he returned to England and to Blackfriars, Oxford. He was soon diagnosed with kidney cancer and died in 2002.

Moore wrote a number of books an articles on religion including Believing in God (1988) and a number of works on human sexuality including The Body in Context: Sex and Catholicism (1992). In The Body in Context, Moore challenges theological arguments presented on a number of topics in sexual ethics including those forbidding the use of contraception and condemning homosexuality. The latter topic was expanded in Moore's book A Question of Truth: Christianity and Homosexuality.

Moore returned to University of Oxford as a scholar in 2001, but was soon diagnosed with kidney cancer. He died on 6 December 2002, at the age of 54.

Bibliography

Books 
 
 The Body in Context: Sex and Catholicism (1992)
 A Question of Truth: Christianity and Homosexuality (2003)

Critical studies and reviews of Moore's work
Believing in God

See also

References 

1948 births
2002 deaths
English Dominicans